Him is a 1974 American gay pornographic feature film produced for gay audiences. It was directed by "Ed D. Louie" (possibly a pseudonym) and featured gay mural artist Gustav "Tava" Von Will in the role of Jesus.

Background
The film focuses on a young gay man who develops an erotic fixation with the life of Jesus Christ. The film initially premiered on 27 March 1974 at the 55th Street Playhouse at 154 West 55th Street in New York City. This run lasted until 23 May 1974. It returned to the Playhouse on 6 December 1974, and January 1976. The film also played at the Bijou Theatre in Chicago, the Nob Hill Theatre in San Francisco, the Sansom Cinema in Philadelphia, Gay Paree Theatre in Atlanta, Wood Six Theatre in Highland Park, the David Theatre in New York City, and the Penthouse Theatre in Pittsburgh.

The film was virtually forgotten until 1980, when Harry and Michael Medved cited it in their book The Golden Turkey Awards as the "Most Unerotic Concept in Pornography".

Lost film status
, no copy of Him has been located. It was cited among the most sought-after lost films by the online magazine Film Threat.

Many Internet sites have attempted to debunk Him as a hoax, owing to the Medveds' admission in The Golden Turkey Awards that their book included a non-existent film which they challenged readers to identify.  The real hoax, however, was Dog of Norway, a fictitious movie illustrated with a photograph of the Medveds' pet dog.

Reviews of Him from Screw magazine, Variety, and The Village Voice have also been uncovered; along with a number of newspaper advertisements for its New York theatrical run. The film also received a passing mention in Time magazine.

See also
 List of lost films

References

External links
 
 Commentary on the film by Andrew Sullivan

1970s pornographic films
1974 films
Gay pornographic films
1970s lost films
Lost American films
American pornographic films
Portrayals of Jesus in film
1970s English-language films
1970s American films